Eden Kuriakosse is an Indian actress and model who appears in Tamil, Telugu, and Malayalam films.

Personal life
Eden was trained as a theater actress. She later pursued modelling and has won Miss Kerala, Miss Coimbatore titles and Miss South India finalist.

Career
Eden Kuriakosse made her acting debut in 2013 with the Tamil film Aandava Perumal, and got her breakthrough with the 2014 Tamil supernatural romantic comedy Irukku Aana Illai.Also was the lead in 'panivizhum nilavu' Her next film was a Tamil-Malayalam bilingual titled Thiraikku varaatha kathai in Tamil and Girls in Malayalam. The film directed by Thulasidas featured only female artists and is the first all-women film in Indian cinema. She has seen in guest role in Ean Da Thalayil Ennavaikale". She has been signed to play the female lead in the upcoming Tamil film titled Narai, Manjal Vanam and Thittamittapadi''.

Filmography

References

Actresses in Malayalam cinema
Actresses in Tamil cinema
Indian film actresses
21st-century Indian actresses
Living people
Actresses in Telugu cinema
Actresses from Kerala
Year of birth missing (living people)